The Tulane Green Wave men's basketball team represents Tulane University in NCAA Division I college basketball. The team competes in the American Athletic Conference. They play home games on campus in Devlin Fieldhouse, the 9th-oldest active basketball venue in the nation. The team's last appearance in the NCAA Division I men's basketball tournament was in 1995.

Tulane is the only school from the original Metro Conference that remained in the conference through its 1975 founding, the 1991 breakup that saw several schools form the Great Midwest Conference, the 1995 reunification that created today's Conference USA, and the 2004 realignment of conferences. It rejoined many of its previous conference mates when it became a member of the American Athletic Conference in 2014.

History

Tulane's men's basketball team played its first game on December 9, 1905.

The program fell victim to one of the biggest scandals of the 1980s in college sports when four players, including star forward "Hot Rod" Williams, were accused of taking money and cocaine to alter the final point spreads of games they played in. Clyde Eads and Jon Johnson were granted immunity to testify against Williams, the alleged ringleader. Although he was indicted, the judge eventually declared a mistrial, and no sentence was handed down. Williams spent the next nine years with the NBA's Cleveland Cavaliers. Within days of Williams' indictment, the entire basketball coaching staff and the athletic director resigned.  Shortly afterward school president Eamon Kelly disbanded the basketball program. He did not intend ever to allow its return; he relented in 1988 after several students convinced him that they were being punished for something that occurred when they were not at Tulane.

New head coach Perry Clark rebuilt the program to unprecedented success, including a 1991–92 season that started 13–0 and ended in the second round of the NCAA Tournament. The 1992–93 and 1994–95 teams matched that team's success, but Tulane has not approached such heights since. Clark resigned in 2000 to coach the Miami Hurricanes. The Green Wave failed to make any postseason tournament under Clark's successor, Shawn Finney, or under former Maryland assistant Dave Dickerson.

Ed Conroy was hired as the new head coach in 2010. His teams have seen initial success against out-of-conference foes in each of its seasons but have done poorly in conference games. The 2010–11 team finished 13–17 after a 12–3 start, while his 2011–12 team finished 15–16 after starting 14–6.

On March 14, 2016, Tulane fired Conroy after six years as head coach. He was replaced by former longtime NBA coach Mike Dunleavy, Sr. On March 16, 2019, after a 4–27 season, the Tulane athletic department fired Mike Dunleavy Sr.

Popular culture
In the 1992 sports comedy film White Men Can't Jump, character Billy Hoyle mentions he is a former Green Wave player.

Postseason

NCAA tournament results
The Green Wave have appeared in three NCAA Tournaments. Their combined record is 3–3.

NIT results
The Green Wave have appeared in six National Invitation Tournaments (NIT). Their combined record is 7–6.

CBI results
The Green Wave have appeared in one College Basketball Invitational (CBI). Their combined record is 0–1.

CIT results
The Green Wave have appeared in one CollegeInsider.com Postseason Tournament (CIT). Their combined record is 1–1.

Notable players
The following Green Wave players have played in the NBA:
John Arthurs
Hot Rod Williams
Linton Johnson
Paul Thompson
Jerald Honeycutt
Melvin Frazier
Cameron Reynolds

Others:
Sammis Reyes (born 1995), Chilean player who switched to American football
Taylor Rochestie (born 1985), American-Montenegrin player in the Israel Basketball Premier League

See also
List of NCAA Division I men's basketball programs

References

External links